"Do You Remember" is the debut single released from Australian singer-songwriter Jarryd James. The song was written and produced by Jarryd James and Joel Little (who had previously worked with Broods and Lorde). It was released digitally on 30 January 2015. "Do You Remember" debuted at number 44 on the ARIA Singles Chart and peaked at number 2 in its fifth week on the chart. It peaked at number 1 on the AIR chart.

A black and white video was released on YouTube on 8 March 2015.

A remix EP was released on 12 February 2016.

At the Queensland Music Awards of 2016, "Do You Remember" won Highest Selling Single.

Reviews
Mike Wass from Idolator said: "'Do You Remember' is a winning mix of R&B and eerie electronica. It's a refreshingly original sound, but there's an undeniable pop sensibility that still makes it palatable to radio programmers and, as it turns out, the general public."

Chris from Indie Music Filters said: "[Do You Remember] feels like a tastefully subdued cousin of AWOLNation's hit 'Sail', plucked strings and deliberate percussion building to an excellent chorus."

Track listing
One-track single
 "Do You Remember"

Digital remix single
 "Do You Remember" (featuring Raury)

Remix EP
 "Do You Remember" (Noah Breakfast Remix) – 3:41
 "Do You Remember" (Chet Porter Remix) – 4:35
 "Do You Remember" (Smle Remix) – 4:00
 "Do You Remember" (Melé Remix) – 4:21
 "Do You Remember" (Strange Talk Remix) – 5:07

Digital remix single
 "Do You Remember" (featuring Grey Remix)

Charts

Weekly charts

Year-end charts

Certifications

Release history

References

2015 debut singles
2014 songs
Jarryd James songs
ARIA Award-winning songs
Songs written by Joel Little